7th Generation can refer to:

Seven generation sustainability, the idea that decisions should be considered for their impact on the seventh generation to come, inspired by the laws of the Iroquois
Seventh Generation Inc., a Vermont-based manufacturer of cleaning products, a subsidiary of Unilever since 2016.
History of video game consoles (seventh generation), the previous generation of video games containing the Xbox 360, Nintendo DS, Wii, PlayStation Portable, and PlayStation 3
7th Generation, a children's publishing imprint with Native American subjects owned by Book Publishing Company

See also
 Generation (disambiguation)